Gymnoscelis acutipennis is a moth in the family Geometridae. It was described by William Warren in 1902. It is endemic to Kenya.

Description
It have a very small basal patch and broad central fascia which is black in colour. Head, abdomen, and thorax are all pale green while the rings on the abdomen are black.

References

Endemic moths of Kenya
Moths described in 1902
acutipennis
Endemic fauna of Kenya
Moths of Africa